Richard Mustoe is a former Welsh rugby union footballer (born 9 December 1981). A winger, he played for Bridgend, Celtic Warriors, Ospreys and the Cardiff Blues. In July 2007 he joined Newport Gwent Dragons on a one-season loan from the Ospreys, making 20 appearances and scoring 15 points for the Dragons. After returning from his loan deal at the Dragons he moved to Cardiff in 2008.

Mustoe retired in December 2012 due to a pelvic injury sustained whilst playing for the Cardiff Blues against Treviso.

Mustoe was a Wales sevens international member.

Mustoe was called up to the senior Wales squad for the tour of North America in 2009, though he was later cut from the squad and put on stand by.

References

External links
Newport Gwent Dragons Profile
Cardiff Blues Profile

Welsh rugby union players
Ospreys (rugby union) players
Cardiff Rugby players
Dragons RFC players
1981 births
Living people
Rugby union players from Bridgend
Rugby union wings